The Grande River is a river of Rio de Janeiro state in southeastern Brazil. It flows through the city of Rio de Janeiro, is briefly renamed Arroio Fundo, and discharges into the Comorim Lagoon.

See also
List of rivers of Rio de Janeiro

References
Brazilian Ministry of Transport

Rivers of Rio de Janeiro (state)